Iota Aquarii, Latinised from ι Aquarii, is the Bayer designation for a binary star system in the equatorial constellation of Aquarius. It is visible to the naked eye with an apparent magnitude of +4.279. The system is drifting closer to the Sun with a radial velocity of −10 km/s.

The binary nature of this system was reported in 2009 following a radial velocity survey using the HARPS instrument. A 2010 infrared search for companions around this star was unsuccessful. The presence of a stellar companion was confirmed through direct spectral detection in 2016. The companion shows a significant velocity variation over a 77-day interval, suggesting a short orbital period.

The spectrum of the primary, component A, fits a stellar classification of B8 V, showing that this is a B-type main-sequence star. It is roughly 124 million years old and is spinning rapidly with a projected rotational velocity of 135 km/s. The star has 3.2 times the mass of the Sun and 2.7 times the Sun's radius. It is radiating 74 times the luminosity of the Sun from its photosphere at an effective temperature of ~11,284 km/s. The secondary, component B, has a spectrum of a solar-mass star. The system is a source for X-ray emission.

References

External links
 Image Iota Aquarii

B-type main-sequence stars
Spectroscopic binaries

Aquarius (constellation)
Aquarii, Iota
Durchmusterung objects
Aquarii, 033
209819
109139
8418